Sergio Rubini (born 21 December 1959) is an Italian actor, film director and screenwriter.

Life and career 
Rubini was born in Grumo Appula, Apulia, but soon moved to Rome to study acting.  After some roles in theater, he debuted in a feature film with Figlio mio infinitamente caro (1985), which was followed by Desiderando Giulia and Il caso Moro.  In 1987 he appeared in Federico Fellini's Intervista.

In 1989 Rubini debuted also as a director with La stazione, written with his friend Umberto Marino.  The film won a Silver Ribbon and a David di Donatello as best debut work.  In 1994 he was again actor in Carlo Verdone's Al lupo al lupo, and the following year he directed himself and Nastassja Kinski in La bionda. In 1994 he co-wrote Giuseppe Tornatore's Una pura formalità.

In 1997 he had a cameo appearance in Gabriele Salvatores' film Nirvana, and the same year he directed and starred in The Bride’s Journey (Il viaggio della sposa) with Giovanna Mezzogiorno.  In 2000 Rubini was directed again by Salvatores in Denti. In 2004, he cast as Saint Dismas in Mel Gibson's The Passion of the Christ.

Filmography

Actor 

 Figlio mio infinitamente caro (1985) - Marco Morelli
 Desiderando Giulia (1986) - Stefano
 Il caso Moro (1986) - Giovanni Moro
 Intervista (1987) - Reporter / Sergio Rubini
 Il Grande Blek (1987) - Razzo
 Una notte, un sogno (1988)
 Treno di panna (1988) - Giovanni Maimeri
 I giorni randagi (1988) - Pino
 Mortacci (1989) - Lucillo Cardellini
 Nulla ci può fermare (1989) - Il postino
 Oltre l'oceano (1990)
 The Station (1990) - Domenico
 Chiedi la luna (1991) - The Hitchhiker
 Al lupo al lupo (1992) - Vanni Sagonà
 La bionda (1993) - Tommaso
 Condannato a nozze (1993) - Roberto
 Una pura formalità (1994) - Andre, the Young Policeman
 Prestazione straordinaria (1994) - Aldo Fiore
 Love Story with Cramps (1995) - Roberto
 Il cielo è sempre più blu (1996)
 Nirvana (1997) - Joystick
 The Bride's Journey (1997) - Bartolo
 L'albero delle pere (1998) - Massimo
 Del perduto amore (1998) - Italo
 The Count of Monte Cristo (1998, TV Mini-Series) - Bertuccio
 Ecco fatto (1998) - Madman (uncredited)
 Panni sporchi (1999)
 Die letzte Station (1999) - Nelu
 The Talented Mr. Ripley (1999) - Inspector Roverini
 Mirka (2000) - Helmut
 Tutto l'amore che c'è (2000) - Carlo's Father
 Giorni dispari (2000)
 Denti (2000) - Antonio
 Momo alla conquista del tempo (2001) - Primo Uomo Grigio (voice)
 Amnèsia (2002) - Angelino
 La forza del passato (2002) - Gianni Orzan
 L'anima gemella (2002) - Angelantonio
 A. A. A. Achille (2003) - Remo
 Mio cognato (2003) - Toni Catapano
 The Passion of the Christ (2004) - Dismas
 L'amore ritorna (2004) - Giacomo
 Manuale d'amore (2005) - Marco
 La Terra (2006) - Tonino
 Commediasexi (2006) - Mariano Di Virgilio
 Manual of Love 2 (2007) - Fosco
 Colpo d'occhio (2008) - Lulli
 No Problem (2008) - Enrico Pignataro
  (2009) - Egidio - Saras Onkel und Barbesitzer
 Cosmonauta (2009) - Armando
 L'uomo nero (2009) - Ernesto Rossetti
 Tutto l'amore del mondo (2010) - Maurizio Marini
 Genitori & figli - Agitare bene prima dell'uso (2010) - Patient on the bench (uncredited)
 Qualunquemente (2011) - Gerardo Salerno
 6 sull'autobus (2012)
 Discovery at Dawn (2012) - Lorenzo, Barbara's boyfriend
 Mi rifaccio vivo (2013) - Avvocato Mancuso
 How Strange to Be Named Federico (2013) - Madonnaro
 Road 47 (2013) - Roberto
 The Fifth Wheel (2013) - Fabrizio Del Monte
 La nostra terra (2014) - Cosimo
 Ever Been to the Moon? (2015) - Delfo
 Let's Talk (2015) - Vanni
 La stoffa dei sogni (2016) - Oreste Campese
 Questi giorni (2016) - il papà di Angela
 No Country for Young Men (2017) - Padre di Sandro
 Terapia di coppia per amanti (2017) - Prof. Malavolta
 Quando sarò bambino (2018)
 Il bene mio (2018) - Elia
 The King's Musketeers (2018) - Aramis
 Il grande spirito (2019) - Tonino
 Se mi vuoi bene (2019) - Massimiliano
 The Story of My Wife (2020)

Director 
 La stazione (1990)
 La bionda (1993)
 Prestazione straordinaria (1994)
 Il viaggio della sposa (1997)
 Tutto l'amore che c'è (2000)
 L'anima gemella (2001)
 L'amore ritorna (2004)
 La Terra (2006)
 Colpo d'occhio (2008)
 L'uomo nero (2009)
 Mi rifaccio vivo (2013)
 Let's Talk (2015)
 Il Grande Spirito (2019)
 I fratelli De Filippo (2021)

References

External links 

1959 births
Living people
People from the Province of Bari
Italian male actors
Italian film directors
Accademia Nazionale di Arte Drammatica Silvio D'Amico alumni
David di Donatello winners
Nastro d'Argento winners
Ciak d'oro winners